Mardore is a former commune in the Rhône department in Rhône-Alpes region in eastern France.

On 1 January 2013, Mardore and four other communes merged becoming one commune called Thizy-les-Bourgs.

References

Former communes of Rhône (department)
Beaujolais (province)